Helen Stuart Marcovicci (January 10, 1919 – August 16, 2016) was an American cabaret and torch singer. Stuart appeared at New York City venues including the Maisonette Room, the La Vie Parisienne, and the Glass Hat (where Martin and Lewis met) during the heyday of her career in the 1940s. In the later 20th and 21st centuries, she appeared in stage shows with her daughter, cabaret star Andrea Marcovicci, at venues including the Oak Room in New York City.

Stuart came to New York as an au pair. A beauty, she was Miss Television at the 1939 New York World's Fair, after which she began appearing as a singer. Stuart married Transylvania-born, Vienna-educated physician Eugen Marcovicci, who was about 34 years her senior, having been born in 1885. After that she changed her name to Marcovicci and curtailed her singing career. She was the mother of racing-engine firm owner Peter Marcovicci as well as Andrea Marcovicci, who credits her mother with passing down her love of and skill in cabaret.

Discography
Albums (as Helen Marcovicci)
I'm Stepping Out With a Dream Tonight
Seems Like Old Times (2008, CD Baby)

Compilations (as Helen Marcovicci)
"Look for the Silver Lining" (featuring Andrea Macovicci) on Just Kern by Andrea Macovicci (1992, Elba)

References 

1919 births
2016 deaths
Torch singers
Traditional pop music singers
Singers from New York City